= Thunder Wolves =

2013 video game

- Developer: Most Wanted Entertainment
- Platforms: PlayStation 3 and PC
- Release: 2013
- Modes: Single-player and multiplayer

Thunder Wolves is a 2013 video game developed by Budapest-based studio Most Wanted Entertainment.

== Reception ==
Writing for PlayStation Magazine, Phil Iwaniuk criticized the game's graphics, repetitive gameplay, and tone. Gamespot wrote that "this game is more than the sum of its parts, creating something refreshing among so many modern military games' imposed political undertones. Insubstantial, fun, and politically insensitive, Thunder Wolves would feel more at home in a different time. It doesn't last long, and there are not a lot of complex or nuanced mechanics, but those aren't really needed here."

Scott Butterworth of IGN described the game as repetitive, and wrote that "Thunder Wolves isn't so much a wolf as a one-trick pony. And while that one trick – frantic, adrenaline-pumping action served with a healthy dose macho humor and feel-good firepower – is an exceptionally fun trick, it doesn't last long."
